Ülkü Adatepe (born Ülkü Çukurluoğlu; November 27, 1932 – August 1, 2012) was the youngest adopted daughter of Mustafa Kemal Atatürk.  Her interactions with Atatürk were often featured in Turkish media, including the cover of the Alfabe textbook, which featured Ülkü studying with Atatürk.

She died in a road accident in 2012.

References

Mustafa Kemal Atatürk
Articles containing video clips
Road incident deaths in Turkey
Burials at Zincirlikuyu Cemetery
1932 births
2012 deaths